Compostimonas suwonensis is a Gram-positive, aerobic and non-motile species of bacteria from the family Microbacteriaceae which has been isolated from spent mushroom compost from Suwon.

References

Microbacteriaceae
Monotypic bacteria genera
Bacteria described in 2012